Learning to Be Silent is the third album by composer C.W. Vrtacek, released in 1986 through Cordelia Records. Despite never being individually issued on CD, the album can be found in its entirety on the 1996 anthology Silent Heaven.

Track listing

Personnel 
Myles Davis – mixing
Kim Gellatly – xylophone on "Emily, Are You Happy?"
Michael Gellatly – illustrations
Marc Sichel – bass guitar on "Crooked Heart" 
C.W. Vrtacek – synthesizer, acoustic guitar, guitar, piano, xylophone, ukulele, production, mixing, recording
James Woodruff – narration on "Fly/Wave"

References 

1986 albums
C.W. Vrtacek albums